Hajrah is a town about  south-east of Jeddah in Saudi Arabia

Muhammad ventured here to complete his journey and mission to spread Islam. Although he was exiled from Mecca, he returned shortly after amassing followers in Hajrah.

See also 

 List of cities and towns in Saudi Arabia

Populated places in Mecca Province